Felix Holt, the Radical (1866) is a social novel written by George Eliot about political disputes in a small English town at the time of the First Reform Act of 1832.

In January 1868, Eliot penned an article entitled "Address to Working Men, by Felix Holt". This came on the heels of the Second Reform Act of 1867 which expanded the right to vote beyond the landed classes and was written in the character of, and signed by, Felix Holt.

Plot introduction 
Set during the time of the Reform Act of 1832, the story centres on an election contested by Harold Transome, a local landowner, in the "Radical cause" ("Radical" because Transome's version of "radicalism" isn't radical at all, but rather an application of the term to his politically stagnant lifestyle), contrary to his family's Tory traditions. Contrasting with the opportunism of Transome is the sincere, but opinionated, Radical Felix Holt. A subplot concerns the stepdaughter of a Dissenting minister who is the true heir to the Transome estate, but who is unaware of the fact. She becomes the object of the affections of both Harold Transome and Felix Holt.

Plot summary 
As the story starts, the reader is introduced to the fictitious community of Treby in the English Midlands in 1832, around the time of the First Reform Act. Harold Transome, a local landowner, has returned home after a fifteen-year trading career in the Middle East. Wealthy from trade, he stands for election to Parliament from the county seat of North Loamshire. But contrary to his family's Tory traditions, he intends to stand as a Radical. This alienates him from his traditional allies and causes despair for his mother, Mrs. Transome. Harold Transome gains the support of his Tory uncle, the Rector of Little Treby, and enlists the help of his family lawyer, Matthew Jermyn, as an electioneering agent.

Much of his electioneering is focused in Treby Magna. In this village resides Felix Holt, who has recently returned from extensive travels in Glasgow to live with his mother. He meets with Rev. Rufus Lyon, a Dissenting minister in Treby Magna, and his stepdaughter, Esther. Felix and Mr. Lyon become ready friends, but he appears to treat Esther with condescension. Felix and Rev. Lyon both appear aligned to the Radical cause.

Harold Transome learns that Jermyn has been mismanaging the Transome estate and embezzling money for himself. Transome remains silent during the election, yet Jermyn tries to devise a plan to save himself from future prosecution. Meanwhile, Felix witnesses some electioneering for the Radical cause in the nearby mining town of Sproxton. He is upset with the 'treating' of workers with beer in exchange for their vocal support. Felix relays his concerns to Harold Transome, who chastises John Johnson for his electioneering methods. However, Jermyn convinces Transome not to interfere.

Rev. Lyon learns from Maurice Christian, servant of Philip Debarry, about the possible identity of Esther's biological father. Rev. Lyon decides to tell Esther the truth about her father. Esther's outlook on life changes upon finding that she is in fact Rev. Lyon's stepdaughter. Her relationship with her stepfather deepens, while she also desires to emulate the high moral standards impressed upon her by Felix Holt. Seeing the change in Esther's character, Felix Holt begins to fall in love with her. However, both share the feeling that they are destined never to marry each other. Meanwhile, Rev. Lyon challenges Rev. Augustus Debarry to a theological debate. The debate is initially agreed to, but is cancelled at the last minute.

Riots erupt on election day in Treby Magna. Drunken mine workers from Sproxton assault townspeople and wantonly destroy property. Felix Holt is caught up in the riots, and tries foolhardily to direct its hostility away from the town. But in the end, Felix Holt is charged with the manslaughter of a constable who tried to break up the riot. Harold Transome also loses the election to Debarry.

Harold Transome begins legal proceedings against Jermyn for the latter's mismanagement of the Transome estate. Jermyn counters by threatening to publicise the true owner of the Transome estate. However, Maurice Christian informs the Transomes that the true owner of the estate is in fact Esther Lyon. Harold Transome invites her to the Transome estate, hoping to persuade her to marry him. Harold and Esther establish a good rapport, and Esther also becomes more sympathetic with Mrs. Transome, whose despair has continued to deepen. Esther feels torn between Harold Transome and Felix Holt. She compares a life of comfortable wealth with Harold Transome and motherly affection with Mrs. Transome, to a life of personal growth in poverty with Felix Holt. Meanwhile, at Felix Holt's trial, Rev. Lyon, Harold Transome and Esther Lyon all vouch for his character, but he is nevertheless found guilty of manslaughter. However, Harold Transome and the Debarrys manage to have Felix Holt pardoned.

Harold Transome proposes to Esther Lyon, with the eager support of Mrs. Transome. But despite Esther's feelings towards both Harold and Mrs. Transome, she declines the proposal. In an altercation between Jermyn and Harold Transome, it is revealed that Jermyn is Harold Transome's father. Harold considers he will no longer be suitable for marriage to Esther. Esther also surrenders her claim to the Transome estate. The story ends with Felix Holt and Esther Lyon marrying and moving away from Treby, along with Rev. Lyon. Matthew Jermyn is eventually ruined and moves abroad, while John Johnson remains and prospers as a lawyer. The Debarrys remain friends with the Transomes, and the contest to the Transome estate, while widely known, is never discussed.

Characters 
 Felix Holt – Young, earnest and opinionated Radical recently returned to Treby Magna from a medical apprenticeship in Glasgow. Felix Holt prefers a life of working-class poverty over a life of comfortable wealth. He works as a watchmaker, supporting his mother and an adopted child, Job. Although not a churchgoer, he befriends the Dissident minister in Treby Magna, Rev. Rufus Lyon. Felix is initially disdainful of Rev. Lyon's refined daughter, Esther, but his attitude towards her eventually begins to soften and he falls in love with her. His earnest but imprudent actions earn the disdain of many Trebians, and land him in trouble during the election day riots.
 Harold Transome – 35-year-old wealthy landowner recently returned to Treby from a 15-year trading career in the Middle East. He returns to England a widower with a young son, Harry. He runs for the county seat of North Loamshire in parliamentary elections as a Radical, contrary to his family's Tory traditions. Not long after his return to England, he discovers Jermyn's mismanagement of the Transome estate, and while using Jermyn as an electioneering agent, Harold Transome devises legal proceedings against him. The relationship between the two men deteriorates as the story progresses. Jermyn confronts him with information on a possible contestor to the ownership of the Transome estate. Harold Transome also takes a liking to Esther Lyon later in the story.
 Esther Lyon – Stepdaughter of the Dissenting minister in Treby Magna, Rev. Rufus Lyon. Esther earns a modest income as a teacher. She also has a refined sense of fashion and manners. Her refined appearance and behaviour appear repugnant to Felix Holt at first, but her developing earnestness softens his disdain. Learning that she is not Rev. Lyon's biological daughter does not diminish her filial affection, but rather it strengthens their relationship. Her new past brings her potential new wealth when she learns that she is the true heir to the Transome estate. Later in the story, Esther feels torn between Felix Holt and Harold Transome, both of whom are in love with her.
 Rev. Rufus Lyon – Dissenting minister in Treby Magna, who has one stepdaughter, Esther. He befriends Felix Holt, a Radical. He also learns from Maurice Christian the possible identity of Esther's biological father. Throughout the story, the bond between his stepdaughter and him grows stronger, and he remains a helpful friend to Felix Holt.
 Matthew Jermyn – Transome family lawyer and former manager of the Transome estate. He agrees to act as Harold Transome's agent during county elections. However, after Transome discovers his mismanagement of the estate, Jermyn devises plans to stave off prosecution. He discovers a possible contestor to the ownership of the Transome estate, information which he tries to use against Harold. Jermyn also earns the disdain of John Johnson and Maurice Christian. He also holds one other secret from Transome.
 Mrs. Transome – Mother of Harold Transome. Her husband's senility has left her in charge of the Transome estate while her sons are absent. Prior to the beginning of the story, her irresponsible oldest son has died, and she is eagerly anticipating her younger son's return to England. Harold Transome does return, but her expectations of their happy future life are dashed soon after. Her son treats her kindly but insensitively, and Mrs. Transome's despair over her changing situation deepens as the story progresses.
 Maurice Christian – Servant of Philip Debarry. He discovers and reveals critical information to various characters at different stages throughout the story. Sir Maximus Debarry learns through Maurice Christian that Harold Transome is a Radical candidate. Rev. Lyon learns through an interview with Christian the possible identity of Esther's biological father. Jermyn confronts Christian about his past, identifying him as Henry Scaddon, a criminal who was held in a French prison with one Maurice Christian Bycliffe, with whom he swapped names. Mr. Bycliffe was thus discovered to be Esther Lyon's biological father. Maurice Christian encounters a bill sticker named Tommy Trounsem who has a rightful claim to the Transome estate. But upon Trounsem's death, Maurice Christian informs Harold Transome about Esther Lyon's rightful claim to the Transome estate.
 John Johnson – Electioneering agent working for Harold Transome. Mr. Johnson receives the patronage of Matthew Jermyn, although he harbours a growing sense of resentment towards his patron. He encourages a group of miners in a Sproxton pub to vocally support the Radical cause, by 'treating' them to beer, over the objections of Felix Holt and Harold Transome. This tactic backfires when the intoxicated workers become a riotous mob on election day.
 Thomas Trounsem – Bill sticker and resident of the Transome estate. He is in fact a member of the Transome family who lives in disempowered poverty. While he remains alive, the Transome estate legally remains with the Transome family. However, when Tommy Trounsem dies in the election day riots, Esther Lyon becomes the rightful owner of the Transome estate.
 Sir Maximus Debarry – Tory baronet. He is a neighbour and traditional ally to the Transome family. However, his friendship with the Transomes is suspended when he discovers Harold Transome's position as a Radical. But after the election the friendship between the two families is restored. Sir Maximus Debarry also works to get Felix Holt pardoned.
 Rev. Augustus Debarry – Rector of Treby Magna, brother of Sir Maximus Debarry and uncle of Philip Debarry. Rufus Lyon challenges him to a theological debate, which Rev. Debarry defers to Rev. Sherlock. The debate is called off when Rev. Sherlock absconds.
 Philip Debarry – Nephew of Rev. Augustus Debarry and Tory candidate for the seat of North Loamshire in parliamentary elections. He sends Maurice Christian to meet with Rev. Lyon to retrieve lost personal property. Philip Debarry wins the election for the seat of North Loamshire in Parliament and is the means by which Felix Holt receives a pardon from the Home Secretary.
 Mr. Transome, Snr – Father of Harold Transome. Mr. Transome, Snr is senile, and the estate is managed by Mrs. Transome and Matthew Jermyn, prior to Harold Transome's return to England. He enjoys playing with Harold Transome's young son, Harry.
 Mary Holt – Mother of Felix Holt. Her situation in the story reflects that of Mrs. Transome: both of them are treated kindly but insensitively by their sons.
 Rev. John Lingon – Rector of Little Treby and uncle to Harold Transome. Despite his own Tory background, he agrees to help Harold Transome with the election.

Literary significance and criticism 

After the lack of success with Romola, George Eliot returned to the more familiar English provincial setting for Felix Holt, the Radical, and resumed her publishing relationship with Blackwood's Magazine. Both George Henry Lewes and John Blackwood were reportedly excited at the prospect of a novel pertinent to current affairs. However, upon the story's release, some criticism was drawn to its less-than-substantial focus on politics, although this itself can be argued as representing an underlying theme in the book. Overall, Felix Holt, the Radical was an average success, but it remains one of George Eliot's least read novels.

Film, TV or theatrical adaptations 
 A black-and-white silent film named Felix Holt was made in 1915.
 The BBC Radio produced a three-part adaption of Felix Holt, in 2007, written by Michael Eaton.

References

External links 
Felix Holt, the Radical free PDF of Blackwood's 1878 Cabinet Edition (the critical standard with Eliot's final corrections) at the George Eliot Archive
 Project Gutenberg download
 
 Information on the Victorian Web
 
 George Eliot Archive

1866 British novels
British novels adapted into films
Fiction set in 1832
Novels about politicians
Novels by George Eliot
Novels set in the 1830s
William Blackwood books